Martin Julius Pash (12 November 1883 – 2 May 1920) was an Australian rules footballer who played with South Melbourne in the Victorian Football League (VFL).

Notes

External links 

1883 births
1920 deaths
Australian rules footballers from Melbourne
Sydney Swans players
People from Port Melbourne